Petrovsko-Razumovskaya is a prospective railway station on the Savyolovskaya line of Moscow Railway and Line D1 of the Moscow Central Diameters in Moscow. Construction of the station started in 2020.

Gallery

References

Railway stations in Moscow
Railway stations of Moscow Railway
Line D1 (Moscow Central Diameters) stations